The J. J. Atkins, registered as the T.J. Smith Stakes, is a Brisbane Racing Club Group 1 Thoroughbred horse race for two-year-olds run at set weights over a distance of 1600 metres at Eagle Farm Racecourse, Brisbane in June during the Queensland Winter Racing Carnival. Total prizemoney is A$1,000,000.

Due to track reconstruction of Eagle Farm Racecourse for the 2014–15 racing season the event was transferred to Doomben Racecourse.

History
The race was long considered the premier two-year-old race of the Brisbane Winter Carnival.
It has been renamed several times since its inaugural running as The Claret Stakes.
In 1999 the race name was renamed after legendary trainer T.J. Smith. In 2013 the race was once again renamed to honour Queensland trainer Jim Atkins who won every major staying race in the Brisbane area except a QTC Oaks - a race in which he had seven minor placegetters. He won the Brisbane premiership four times.

Name
1893–1975 - Claret Stakes
1976–1982 - Marlboro Stakes
1983–1987 - Castlemaine Stakes
 1988 - Channel Nine Stakes
1989–1994 - Castlemaine Stakes 
1995–1998 - Q.T.C. Classic 
1999–2012 - The T. J. Smith
2013 onwards - J. J. Atkins

Grade
1893–1979 - Principal Race
1980–1984 - Group 2
1985 onwards - Group 1

Distance
 1893–1904 - 6 furlongs (~1200 metres)
 1905–1954 - 7 furlongs (~1400 metres)
 1955–1972 - 1 mile (~1600 metres)
 1973 onwards - 1600 metres

Venue
 2015 - Doomben Racecourse
 2017 - Doomben Racecourse
 2018 - Doomben Racecourse

Winners

 2022 - Sheeza Belter
 2021 - Converge
 2020 - Rothfire
 2019 - Prince Fawaz
 2018 - The Autumn Sun
 2017 - Capital Gain
 2016 - Sacred Elixir
 2015 - Press Statement
 2014 - Almalad
 2013 - Romantic Touch
 2012 - Sizzling
 2011 - Benfica
 2010 - Pressday
 2009 - Linky Dink
 2008 - Rockdale
 2007 - Apercu
 2006 - Reigning To Win
 2005 - Darci Brahma
 2004 - Outback Prince
 2003 - Picaday
 2002 - Lovely Jubly
 2001 - Juanmo
 2000 - Show A Heart
 1999 - Freemason
 1998 - Mossman
 1997 - Al Mansour
 1996 - Anthems
 1995 - Ravarda
 1994 - Just A Printer
 1993 - Mahogany
 1992 - Slight Chance
 1991 - Zinders
 1990 - Chime Zam
 1989 - Prince Salieri
 1988 - Zeditave
 1987 - Flotilla
 1986 - One Guinea
 1985 - Tristram's Edition
 1984 - Prince Frolic
 1983 - Regal Advice
 1982 - Anchor In
 1981 - Copperama
 1980 - Royal Paree
 1979 - Zephyr Zi
 1978 - Scomeld
 1977 - Luskin Star
 1976 - Romantic Dream 
 1975 - Polenza 
 1974 - Knight Reign
 1973 - †Light Appeal/Dalrello 
 1972 - †Alostar/Femme Fatale
 1971 - †Manilove/Hot Head
 1970 - †Kusarawa/West Coast
 1969 - †Belle Of Burgundy/Forward Pass
 1968 - Desert Beau
 1967 - Quick Dollar
 1966 - Rushkhana
 1965 - Neive's Choice
 1964 - Scolvin
 1963 - Skeencourt
 1962 - Arrogant Boy
 1961 - Bush Belle
 1960 - Le Storm
 1959 - Greenwood Star
 1958 - Espalier
 1957 - Karunda
 1956 - Chilly Glance
 1955 - Royal Gaekwar
 1954 - †Beau Moon/Faith Again 
 1953 - Callide River 
 1952 - West Lake
 1951 - Khazana
 1950 - Ninth Mark
 1949 - Mr. Sunray
 1948 - Naispear
 1947 - Gold Titan
 1946 - Gay Stand
1942–45 - race not held
 1941 - Lord Spear
 1940 - Rex Buzz
 1939 - Spearace
 1938 - Karait
 1937 - Donarium
 1936 - Monash River
 1935 - Buzzard King
 1934 - Linart
 1933 - Utterer
 1932 - Scottish Airs
 1931 - Morning Carol
 1930 - Monash Valley
 1929 - Lady Bine
 1928 - Ambershire
 1927 - The Kist
 1926 - Oedipus
 1925 - Taupo
 1924 - Civetta
 1923 - Bribie
 1922 - Rabisu
 1921 - Admetus
 1920 - Litre
 1919 - Eudor Furly
 1918 - Had I Wist
 1917 - Rose Et Noir
 1916 - Amberdown
 1915 - Irish Colleen
 1914 - Lado
 1913 - Rose O' Merton
 1912 - Bronze King
 1911 - Yeena Lad
 1910 - Cowl
 1909 - Braw Laddie
 1908 - Barallan
 1907 - Capture
 1906 - Inglewood
 1905 - Volant
 1904 - Archives
 1903 - Fitz Grafton
 1902 - Ivan
 1901 - The Maine
 1900 - Araxes
 1899 - Arc En Ciel
 1898 - Boreas II
 1897 - Boscobel
 1896 - College Cap
 1895 - Caesar
 1894 - Duke Of York
 1893 - Common

† Run in Divisions

 Almalad was later renamed Friends of Ka Ying

See also
 List of Australian Group races
 Group races

References

Group 1 stakes races in Australia
Flat horse races for two-year-olds
Recurring sporting events established in 1893